The 1978 Women's Cricket World Cup was an international cricket tournament played in India from 1 to 13 January 1978. Hosted by India for the first time, it was the second edition of the Women's Cricket World Cup, after the inaugural 1973 World Cup in England.

It was originally proposed that South Africa host the World Cup, but this was abandoned to conform with the sporting boycott of the country. The Women's Cricket Association of India (WCAI) then made a successful bid, and served as the primary organiser, with the International Women's Cricket Council (IWCC) providing only limited oversight. Along with India, which was making its debut, five other teams were originally invited – Australia, England, the Netherlands, New Zealand, and the West Indies. The Netherlands and the West Indies, which had both not previously participated, were forced to withdraw due to financial issues. The four teams that did compete (the lowest number in the tournament's history) played a round-robin tournament of three matches each, with Australia going undefeated to claim its first title. Australia's captain, Margaret Jennings, led the tournament in runs, while her teammate, Sharyn Hill, led the tournament in wickets.

Squads
Information is only available for players who played at least one match at the tournament.

Venues

Warm-up matches
At least five warm-up matches were played against various local Indian teams, all but one of which came before the tournament.

Group stage

Points table

 Note: run rate was to be used as a tiebreaker in the case of teams finishing on an equal number of points, rather than net run rate (as is now common).

Matches

New Zealand vs Australia

India vs England

New Zealand vs India

India vs Australia

New Zealand vs England

England vs Australia
Both Australia and England went into the last match of the tournament undefeated, which meant it functioned as a de facto final, akin to the Uruguay v Brazil match at the 1950 Football World Cup. England's Megan Lear later recounted that the "most memorable part of [the] tournament was playing in front of crowds of 40,000 plus".

Statistics

Most runs
The top five runscorers are included in this table, ranked by runs scored and then by batting average.

Source: Cricinfo CricketArchive

Most wickets

The top five wicket takers are listed in this table, ranked by wickets taken and then by bowling average.

Source: Cricinfo

References

 
1978 in women's cricket
1978
1978 in Indian cricket
World Cup 1978
January 1978 sports events in Asia